Hanumangarh is a city and municipal council in Hanumangarh district in the Indian state of Rajasthan, situated on the banks of the river Ghaggar also identified as Ancient Sarasvati river, located about 400 km from Delhi. It is the administrative headquarter of Hanumangarh District. The city was once called Bhatner (alternatively spelled Bhatnair) because it was founded by king Bhupat in 255 AD. It remained in the control of the Rajputs of Bhati clan and faced a historic siege by Timur in 1391, during which the Bhati Raput king Dulachand lost the fort for a short time. The fort was later occupied by Rao Jetsa of Bikaner.

History

Indus Valley Civilization
Indus Valley civilization sites in the district number over 100 villages along Ghaggar-Hakra River (Palaeochannel  of Sarasvati River), such as Karanpura. Remains found at Kalibangan and Pilibanga in 1951 reveal that this area was a part of nearly 5000 years old civilization. The remains of human skeleton, unknown scripts, stamps, coins, utensils, jewelry, toys, statues, wells, bathrooms, fort, streets, markets, etc. were found. The remains found at these places have been kept at Museum at Kalibangan and National Museum, New Delhi.

Medieval
It has yielded a number of terracotta decorative tiles in the late Kushan Empire style along with a number of coins. Two terracotta capitals at the depth of 15' from the top of the mound with stepped pyramids along their edges have been discovered.
In 1398, Timur invaded the Delhi Sultanate and on his way he attacked Hanumangarh  Fort (Bhatner at that time) defended by its ruler Rao Daljit and his cousin with only 10,000 men. Timur wrestled the fortifications, slayed all the men and enslaved all of the women and children of the Garrison along with their citizens.

Early modern period

Hanumangarh was the kingdom of Bhati Rajputs and hence its earlier name was Bhatner. The Bhati Rajputs were vassals of the Mughal Emperors up until the death of Aurangzeb in 1707. Maharaja Surat Singh Rathore (b.1787 – d.1828) of Bikaner State won this fort on Tuesday. Since Tuesday is the auspicious day of the Hindu deity Hanuman, Surat Singh renamed Bhatner to "Hanumangarh" - the Fort of Hanuman the Hindu-deity. A 1700-year-old Bhatner fort is situated in the middle of Hanumangarh Town, the description of which can be found in Ain-i-Akbari.  A famous Bhadrakali temple is situated near the town on the banks of Ancient Sarasvati river(Ghaggar river).

Demographics

According to 2011 Indian Census, Hanumangarh had a total population of 150,958, of which 79,709 were males and 71,249 were females. Population within the age group of 0 to 6 years was 18,094. The total number of literates in Hanumangarh was 102,149, which constituted 67.7% of the population with male literacy of 73.6% and female literacy of 61.1%. The effective literacy rate of 7+ population of Hanumangarh was 76.9%, of which male literacy rate was 83.8% and female literacy rate was 69.28%. The Scheduled Castes and Scheduled Tribes population was 25,486 and 2,463 respectively. Hanumangarh had 30022 households in 2011.

 India census, Hanumangarh had a population of 129,654. Males constitute 69,583 of the population and females 60,071. The sex ratio was 863 females to 1000 males. Population in the age range of 0–6 years was 18,669. 83,923 people were literates in Hanumangarh which is 64.7% of the total population. The effective literacy of people 7 years and over of age was 75.6%.

Railway Junction 

Hanumangarh Junction railway station is a major railway station on Jodhpur-Bathinda line; Sadulpur, Rewari, Jaipur, Sriganganagar, Anupgarh, (Canaloop). Earlier both meter gauge and broad gauge lines passed through this station and now all lines passing through here have been converted to broad gauge. There is also a Diamond Railway Crossing. In 1982, the broad gauge started from Bhatinda to Suratgarh via Hanumangarh. On 1 October 2012, Hanumangarh-Sadulpur metergauge track closed and it was converted into broad gauge. 3 Hanumangarh to Sri Ganganagar passenger trains are running on the broad gauge track. This track provides smooth rail traffic between two strategically important cantonments at Jaisalmer (Rajasthan) and Udhampur (J&k) via Hanumangarh, Sriganganagar and Firozpur.

Tehsils 
There are 7 following tehsils in the district Hanumangarh: Hanumangarh, Sangaria, Pilibanga, Nohar, Bhadra, Rawatsar and Tibbi.

Language 
Hindi is the official language and English is additional official. Rajasthani language is the major language in Hanumangarh. Bagri language is also used as a second language in most areas of the district in northern part of Rajasthan.

References 

Cities and towns in Hanumangarh district